Elena Quirici (born 16 February 1994) is a Swiss karateka. She is a bronze medalist at the World Karate Championships and a five-time medalist, including three golds, at the European Karate Championships.

She represented Switzerland at the 2020 Summer Olympics in Tokyo, Japan. She competed in the women's +61 kg event.

Career 

At the 2012 World Karate Championships held in Paris, France, she won one of the bronze medals in the women's kumite 61 kg event. In 2015, she won the silver medal in the women's kumite 68 kg event at the European Karate Championships held in Istanbul, Turkey. In that same year, she lost her bronze medal match in the women's kumite 68 kg event at the 2015 European Games held in Baku, Azerbaijan. The following year, she won the gold medal in this event at the 2016 European Karate Championships held in Montpellier, France.

In 2017, she competed in the women's kumite 68 kg event at the World Games held in Wrocław, Poland. She lost two matches and drew one match in the elimination round and she did not advance to the semi-finals.

At the 2018 European Karate Championships held in Novi Sad, Serbia, she won the gold medal in the women's kumite 68 kg event and also the gold medal in the women's team kumite event.

She won one of the bronze medals in the women's kumite 68 kg event at the 2019 European Games held in Minsk, Belarus. Four years earlier, she lost her bronze medal match in the women's kumite 68 kg event at the 2015 European Games held in Baku, Azerbaijan.

In March 2020, she was scheduled to represent Switzerland in karate at the 2020 Summer Olympics in Tokyo, Japan. This changed in March 2021 after the World Karate Federation revised the system for Olympic qualification. In June 2021, she was able to regain her qualification status at the World Olympic Qualification Tournament held in Paris, France. She finished in third place in her pool during the pool stage in the women's +61 kg event and she did not advance to compete in the semifinals. She was the flag bearer for Switzerland during the closing ceremony of the 2020 Summer Olympics. In November 2021, she competed in the women's 68 kg event at the World Karate Championships held in Dubai, United Arab Emirates.

She competed in the women's kumite 68 kg event at the 2022 European Karate Championships held in Gaziantep, Turkey. She was eliminated in her second match by eventual bronze medalist Vasiliki Panetsidou of Greece. She also competed in the women's kumite 68 kg event at the 2022 World Games held in Birmingham, United States.

Achievements

References

External links 

 

Living people
1994 births
Place of birth missing (living people)
Swiss female karateka
Karateka at the 2015 European Games
Karateka at the 2019 European Games
European Games medalists in karate
European Games bronze medalists for Switzerland
Competitors at the 2017 World Games
Competitors at the 2022 World Games
Karateka at the 2020 Summer Olympics
21st-century Swiss women